Orthodoxy in India may refer to:

 Eastern Orthodoxy in India, representing adherents, communities and institutions of various Eastern Orthodox Churches, in India
 Oriental Orthodoxy in India, representing adherents, communities and institutions of various Oriental Orthodox Churches, in India

See also
 Orthodoxy (disambiguation)
 India (disambiguation)
 Orthodox Church (disambiguation)